Applied Catalysis A: General is a peer-reviewed scientific journal covering catalytic science and its applications. It is published by Elsevier and its editors-in-chief is Harold Kung.

Abstracting and indexing 
The journal is abstracted and indexed in:

According to the Journal Citation Reports, the journal has a 2020 impact factor of 5.706.

References

External links 
 

Chemistry journals
Elsevier academic journals
English-language journals